Katran is a village in the Cizre District of Şırnak Province in Turkey. The village is populated by Kurds of the Kiçan, Meman and Xêrikan tribes and had a population of 1,876 in 2021.

The hamlet of Yetkin is attached to Katran.

References 

Villages in Cizre District
Kurdish settlements in Şırnak Province